Muthu Thandavar (1525–1600 CE) (Tamil:முத்துத்தாண்டவர்) was composer of Carnatic music. He was an early architect of the present day Carnatic kriti (song) format, which consists of the pallavi (refrain), anupallavi and charanam. He lived in the town of Sirkazhi in Tamil Nadu. His contributions to Carnatic music have been largely forgotten and not many of his kritis are in vogue today. Muthu Thandavar, along with Arunachala Kavi (1712–1779) and Marimutthu Pillai (1717–1787) are known as the Tamil Trinity of Carnatic music.

Muthu Thandavar also composed several padams, short songs mainly sung accompanying Bharatanatyam performances. Some of these padams are still popular such as Teruvil Varano in raga Khamas and  Ittanai tulambaramo in raga Dhanyasi.

Compositions

Very few of Muththu Thandavar's compositions have survived the test of time. Sixty of them have been collected. Twenty five padams are also available. Some of his compositions that are sung in music concerts are: Arumarundonru tani marundidu (Raga Mohanam or Kambhoji), Pesade Nenjame (Raga Todi), Kaanaammal Vinile (Raga Dhanyasi or kAmbhoji), Teruvil Varano (Raga Khamas), Unai Nambinen Ayya (Raga Keeravani), Isane Koti Surya Prakasane (Raga Nalinakanti), Darisittalavil (Raga Latangi), Sevikka Vendumayya (Raga Andolika), Innum Oru Taram (Raga Simhendramadhyamam), Ambara Cidambaram, Innum Oru Stalam (Raga Suratti), and ADikonDAR (Raga Mayamalavagowla).

References

 M. V. Ramana, Pre-trinity composers of Tamil Nadu - Carnatica.net
Lena Tamilvanan (Ed), (in Tamil) Thamizh Mummanikalin kiirththanaikal, Manimekalai Publications, Chennai 600 017, 1987 (லேனா தமிழ்வானன் (பதிபாசிரியர்), தமிழ் மும்மணிகளின் கீர்த்தனைகள், மணிமேகலைப் பிரசுரம், சென்னை 600 017, முதற்பதிப்பு 1987).
 

Carnatic composers
1525 births
1600 deaths
People from Mayiladuthurai district
16th-century Indian composers